Stadion Sportkompleks Abdysh-Ata is a multi-use stadium in Kant, Kyrgyzstan.  It is currently used mostly for football matches and serves as the home stadium for Abdish-Ata Kant of the Kyrgyzstan League.  The stadium has a capacity of 2,000 people.

External links
Stadium information

Football venues in Kyrgyzstan
Chüy Region